The 2018–19 Newcastle Jets FC season was the club's 18th season since its establishment in 2000. The club participated in the A-League for the 14th time, the FFA Cup for the 5th time, and the AFC Champions League for the 2nd time.

Players

Squad information

Transfers

Transfers in

Transfers out

From youth squad

Contract extensions

Technical staff

Squad statistics

Appearances and goals

 

|-
|colspan="19"|Players no longer at the club:

Pre-season and friendlies

Competitions

Overall

A-League

League table

Results summary

Results by round

Matches

FFA Cup

AFC Champions League

Qualifying play-offs

References

External links
 Official Website

2018–19 A-League season by team
Newcastle Jets FC seasons